The Lent Bumps 2019 was a series of rowing races at Cambridge University from Tuesday 5 March 2019 to Saturday 9 March 2019.  The event was run as a bumps race and was the 132nd set of races in the series of Lent Bumps which have been held annually in late February or early March since 1887. See Lent Bumps for the format of the races.

Head of the River crews
  bumped  outside the Plough on day 1, claiming the headship that Lady Margaret had held since 2017.

Highest 2nd VIIIs

Links to races in other years

References 

2019 in rowing
Lent Bumps results
2019 in English sport